Prem Dhoj Pradhan (6 June 1938 – 6 May 2021) was a Nepalese musician. He was a singer, composer, and regional playback singer. He sang in the two major languages of Nepal: Newari and Nepali. He was also known as the Golden Voice and King of Romantic Melodies of Nepal.

Pradhan was the first musician to perform with a guitar in Nepal and was the first Nepali singer to sing with Indian playback singer Usha Mangeshkar for the movie Maitighar in 1965. In 1985, he sang duet songs with Asha Bhosle for the movie Mayalu in Bombay, India. Pradhan varied his musical style throughout his career and recorded approximately 700 Plus songs in both languages combined on Radio Nepal, including live broadcasting and recorded songs.

Early life 

Prem Dhoj Pradhan was born on 6 June, 1938, in Chautara, a small town 28 miles east of Kathmandu, to Ratna Dhoj Pradhan, a businessman, and Pran Devi Pradhan, a musician.

Pradhan's parents separated when was young, and he went on to be raised by his mother and her family, who imbued in him a love of music. His mother was a talented performer and taught him about music. He also tells a story of listening to classical music for an hour every night with his grandfather at a time when the radio was banned for ordinary Nepalese.

He received a Bachelor of Arts in 1967 from Saraswati Multiple Campus, TU, Nepal.

Musical career

1950s 
Pradhan's music career began in 1952 when he attended a voice test at Radio Nepal. The station, which was once permitted only to broadcast political information, began serving in the early 1950s as a platform for Nepali artists like  Pradhan, allowing them to sing two songs every month. 

Two years later, starting in 1954, Pradhan spent fifteen months studying with the late Ganesh Lal Shrestha. He also, around this time, started performing in Kathmandu with a group of eight other musicians, becoming the first group in the country to perform concerts. And in 1957, together with Tara Devi, he became the first Nepali singer to record a song for Radio Nepal, as opposed to playing live.

1960s 
In 1961, Pradhan had to stop singing for two years after undergoing surgery to remove a non-malignant polyp in his left vocal cord. During the hiatus, he adopted the guitar as part of his new style, becoming the first Nepali singer to do so. He began performing again later that year, and he was awarded a prize for the best voice in the All Nepal Modern Songs Competition in 1963 for "Goreto Tyo Gaunko".

After mastering his signature style, he released his first LP records in the autumn of 1963. By the end of 1969, he had recorded 32 songs.

Unable to find a sponsor, Pradhan personally funded eleven out of his sixteen discs. Towards the end of 1964, he recorded eight songs in Nepali and six in Newari.

In November 1965, he was invited by Jaidev to sing with Usha Mangeshkar for the Nepali film, Maiti Ghar.

1970s 
In 1970, in his own music composition, he recorded ten Nepali songs in an album titled Himalayan Bouquet from Swinging Kathmandu. In the same year he also recorded bhajan songs (six pieces) under Jaidev.

Death 
Pradhan died on 6 May 2021, at Neuro and General Hospital, Sundhara, Kathmandu, after being hospitalized with breathing problems and chest pain.

Honours and awards 
 Received Narayan Gopal Sangeet Samman from Lunkaran-Ganga CSKM, November 2002 
 Felicitated by Nepal Music Welfare Fund for significant contribution to Nepalese music

References

External links
 
 

1938 births
2021 deaths
20th-century Nepalese male singers
Newar-language singers
Nepalese playback singers
People from Sindhupalchowk District
Newar-language lyricists
Tribhuvan University alumni